Marcin Grzegorz Dorociński (born 22 June 1973) is a Polish film, television and stage actor. He is known for playing roles in such films as Reverse (2009), Rose (2011), Jack Strong (2014) and Hurricane (2018) as well as internationally produced TV series Spies of Warsaw (2013) and The Queen's Gambit (2020).

Early life 
Dorociński was born in Milanówek near Warsaw and grew up in a small village Kłudzienko. His father is a blacksmith and his mother is a housewife. He has three brothers, all of whom are police officers. He dreamt of becoming a professional football player, but he was forced to give up the plan after sustaining a major leg injury. He attended the vocational school in Grodzisk Mazowiecki and obtained a machinist certificate. The first person to notice his talent for acting was his history teacher, who encouraged him to become an actor. In 1993, he enrolled at the Aleksander Zelwerowicz State Theatre Academy.

Career 
In his second-year at the State Theatre Academy, he was cast as Don Rodrigue in a television adaptation of Le Cid directed by Krystyna Janda. After graduating from the Academy in 1997, he struggled to find acting jobs at first. He worked as a waiter, a bouncer and took other casual jobs until he was offered a post at the Dramatic Theatre in Warsaw. He has also appeared in several plays in the Ateneum Theatre in Warsaw, in which he is currently employed.

He played minor roles in multiple television series, before his breakthrough came with the role in Patryk Vega's 2005 film Pitbull, which brought him the Zbyszek Cybulski Award. He is a two-time Polish Film Festival award winner for his roles in Reverse (2009) and Rose (2011). The latter also earned him the IFFI Best Actor Award at the 43rd International Film Festival of India. In 2012, he received the Paszport Polityki award. In 2012, he appeared in Magdalena Łazarkiewicz's critically-acclaimed TV series The Deep End ("Głęboka woda") which earned him a nomination for Best Actor Award at the Monte Carlo Television Festival. Between 2012 and 2013, Dorociński appeared in a mini-series called Spies of Warsaw, co-produced by the BBC and Telewizja Polska.

In 2020, he joined the cast of the Netflix drama miniseries The Queen's Gambit starring Anya Taylor-Joy. Based on the 1983 novel by Walter Tevis of the same name, the show explores the life of an orphan chess prodigy named Beth Harmon from the age of eight to twenty-two, as she struggles with addiction in a quest to become a grandmaster in chess. Dorociński plays Soviet world chess champion Vasily Borgov.

Personal life 
He is married to scenic designer Monika Sudół. The couple has a son Stanisław (born 2006) and a daughter Janina (born 2008). They also brought up Sudół's son from a previous relationship, Jakub.

Filmography 

 The Shaman (Szamanka, 1996)
 Two Killers (Kilerów 2-óch, 1997)
 Krugerandy (1999)
 Torowisko (1999)
 Przedwiośnie (2001)
 Where Eskimos Live (Tam, gdzie żyją Eskimosi, 2002)
 Sfora: Bez litości (2002)
 Nienasycenie (2003)
 Show (2003)
 Vinci (2004)
 1409. Afera na zamku Barnstein (2005)
 Pitbull (2005)
 Dzisiaj jest piątek (2006)
 Francuski numer (2006)
 Wstyd (2006)
 We're All Christs (Wszyscy jesteśmy Chrystusami, 2006)
 Ogród Luizy (2007)
 Boisko bezdomnych (2008)
 Rozmowy nocą (2008)
 Idealny facet dla mojej dziewczyny (2009)
 Miłość na wybiegu (2009)
 Reverse (2009)
 Piątek trzynastego (2009)
 The Woman That Dreamed About a Man (Kvinden der drømte om en mand, 2010)
 Lęk wysokości (2011)
 Rose (2011)
 Jesteś Bogiem (2011)
 Obława (2012)
 Miłość (2012)
 Traffic Department (Drogówka, 2013)
 Spies of Warsaw (2013)
 The Mighty Angel (2014)
 Jack Strong (2014) as Jack Strong
 Pakt (2015-2016)
 Star Wars: The Force Awakens (2015) as Kylo Ren (Polish-dub)
 Cape Town (2016)
 Anthropoid (2016) as Ladislav Vaněk
 Dræberne fra Nibe (2017)
 Hurricane (2018)
 The Queen's Gambit (2020) as Vasily Borgov
 Vikings: Valhalla (2023) as Yaroslav the Wise
 Mission: Impossible – Dead Reckoning Part One (2023)

Awards and honours
2005: Zbigniew Cybulski Award for Best Young Polish Actor         
2009: Best Supporting Actor Award at the Gdynia Film Festival for Reverse
2011: Best Actor Award at the Gdynia Film Festival for Rose
2012: IFFI Best Actor Award at the 43rd International Film Festival of India for Rose
2012: Paszport Polityki in the film category awarded annually by the Polityka weekly magazine
2014: Silver Medal Gloria Artis, conferred by the Ministry of Culture and National Heritage of the Republic of Poland 
2021: Wiktor Award for Best Actor

See also
Cinema of Poland
List of Polish actors

References

External links 
 Marcin Dorociński, bio on Culture.pl
 
 www.marcindorocinski.pl - English version Official website

1973 births
Living people
People from Milanówek
Polish male film actors
Polish male stage actors
IFFI Best Actor (Male) winners